Woodlands Waterfront Park is a park located at Admiralty Road West in Singapore and overlooks the sea from the north. The  park houses a large playground with a wide range of equipment and a  waterfront promenade. Central Spine and Green Lawn provides a spacious spots to hold events and picnics. Vantage points located along the trail gives visitors  a panoramic view of the entire coastal park and the Straits of Johor. A  Northern explorer loop connects Woodlands waterfront park to Admiralty Park along with other park connectors.

History
The park was opened in 2010 at a cost of S$19 million.

See also
List of Parks in Singapore

References

External links
Woodlands Waterfront Park at National Parks Board

Parks in Singapore